Alois (Aloys) Ritter von Brinz (25 February 1820, Weiler im Allgäu – 13 September 1887, Munich) was a German jurist and politician.

He taught as a professor at the University of Erlangen, Charles University of Prague, University of Tübingen (1866-), University of Munich (1871-).

He was a researcher of Roman law.

Life 
His father was a Doctor of Laws, his grandfather a master baker in Weiler. Brinz studied in Munich and Berlin and then entered the judicial service of his home state of Bavaria. In Berlin, Professor Adolf August Friedrich Rudorff had encouraged him in the detailed scientific study of Roman law, something which he intensified during his practical work.

In 1851 the University of Erlangen-Nuremberg made him an außerordentlicher Professor (i.e. professor without chair). From 1854 onwards, he worked there as a full professor (ordentlicher Professor) for Roman law. In 1857 he took up a similar position at the Charles University in Prague. In Prague, Brinz also became politically active, becoming a member of the Bohemian parliament in 1861 and later taking a seat in the Austrian Reichsrat. In the Bohemian parliament he was a dedicated parliamentary orator and politician and, together with the other leaders of the German party, Johann Friedrich Wilhelm Herbst and Leopold Hasner von Artha, resolutely defended German interests.

In 1866 he took up a professorship at the University of Tübingen. Here he finished his Textbook of the Pandects (Lehrbuch der Pandekten). He rejected a mandate to join the parliament of Württemberg, but thereupon the parliament elected him a member of the constitutional court.

From 1871 onwards, Alois von Brinz taught Roman civil law at the University of Munich was eventually elected Rector of the university. In 1872 he was awarded the Order of Merit of the Bavarian Crown and due to the Order's statutes, thus entered the German nobility. In 1883 he was elected an ordinary member of the Class for History of the Bavarian Academy of Sciences and Humanities.

He was a member of the Studentenverbindungen Corps Suevia München and Corps Frankonia Prag Saarbrücken.

Family 
 Martin Brinz, a baker in Weiler, fought for Austria against Napoleon, as did his seven brothers; was taken away after the war as a hostage.
 Alois Brinz (born in Weiler; died 1835) was a Doctor of Laws and later clerk of the regional court in Kempten; married Katharina Gsell (born 1793 in Weiler; died 1862), had 10 children.
 Alois Ritter von Brinz (born 1820 in Weiler; died 1887 in Munich) married 1857 Caroline Zenetti (born 1825; died 1895), daughter of senior civil servant and regional president Johann Baptist Ritter von Zenetti; 6 children (daughters Anna and Maria and four sons, Johann, Eduard, Konrad and Arnold)

From the same family are descended the well-known politicians Dr. Bernhard Vogel and his brother Dr. Hans-Jochen Vogel.

Notes

Literary works 

Alois von Brinz composed numerous essays on legal themes. The work Die Lehre von der Kompensation in the area of Roman law earned him much acclaim from the scholars of this field. His main piece of work, the Lehrbuch der Pandekten, was on many occasions described as the most original legal work of the 19th century.

 Die Lehre von der Kompensation, 1849
 Kritische Blätter zivilistischen Inhalts, 1852–53
 Lehrbuch der Pandekten, 2 vpls, 1857–1871
 Zum Rechte der Bonae fidei possessio, 1875

External links
 

1820 births
1887 deaths
People from Lindau (district)
People from the Kingdom of Bavaria
Members of the Austrian House of Deputies (1861–1867)
Members of the Bohemian Diet
Jurists from Bavaria
19th-century German jurists
19th-century German politicians
German expatriates in the Czech lands
German expatriates in Austria
Academic staff of the University of Tübingen
Academic staff of the Ludwig Maximilian University of Munich
Academic staff of the University of Erlangen-Nuremberg
Academic staff of Charles University